The following is a list of international rugby union teams:

National teams – band classification 
Starting in 2008, in addition to the existing tier system, the IRB introduced a four-band system of classification in which unions are classified based on "their development status and record on the international stage". The new structure is:

High performance 
All countries previously in Tiers 1 and 2.

Development One 
These are countries earmarked for increased developmental funding and include:

Targeted 
The IRB did not release a list of unions in this category, but named several as World Cup hopefuls being in this band:

Developmental 

World Rugby associates in italics

Other teams

Multinational teams 

 The British and Irish Lions.
 
 
 
 
 Established in 1950, East Africa conducted seven tours between 1954 and 1982 and played against incoming international, representative and club touring sides including twice against the British Lions; perhaps the only example of representative (as opposed to invitational) multinational teams playing against each other. They also played against the Barbarians.
 
  (formerly Tanganyika)
 
 A similar development in 2004 has been the Pacific Islanders team.
 
 
 
 The South American Jaguars were a combination team who played South Africa during the early 1980s.
 
 
 
 The African Leopards are a development side drawn from across Africa, they have played representative rugby union against South African students.
 The Arabian Gulf rugby union team combined various teams from Arab countries in the Persian Gulf and competed in World Cup qualification. The Arabian Gulf Rugby Union has now been dismantled and responsibility for the game devolved to each of the member nations, although the team may be revived in the future.

 There was also a West Indies side, which first toured when the Caribbean Rugby Union sent a team (managed by Gavin Clark) to tour England in 1976. Their last tour was also to England in October and November 2000.
 The Commonwealth of Independent States played during the early 1990s.

Defunct national sides 
Various national sides have ceased to exist for political reasons. In the case of the Soviet Union, Czechoslovakia and Yugoslavia, there is more than one successor team. In the case of Catalonia, the Spanish Civil War and Franco's crackdown put an end to it, and in the case of East and West Germany, reunification led to their amalgamation into a single German side.

  Arabian Gulf* – dissolved by the end of 2010 and replaced by separate unions and national teams
 
  CIS*
 
 * – a combination of Kenya, Tanzania/Tanganyika and Uganda.  It has not played since 1982 but the Rugby Football Union of East Africa (RFUEA) still exists and there have been recent talks to resurrect the team
 
 
 

* For more information on these teams see above.

Women's rugby

Defunct women's national sides

Invitation sides 
 Nomads

Notes and references

International